The Red Green Show is a Canadian television comedy that aired on various channels in Canada, with its ultimate home at CBC Television, and on Public Broadcasting Service (PBS) in the United States (airing on more than 100 PBS affiliates at its peak), from 1991 until the series finale 7 April 2006. The Red Green Show is essentially a cross between a sitcom and a sketch comedy series, and is a parody of home improvement, do-it-yourself, fishing, and other outdoors shows (particularly The Red Fisher Show). Reruns currently air on CBC Television, CTV Comedy Channel, various Public Broadcasting Service stations, and on the Red Green Channel on Roku televisions. It was produced by S&S Productions, which is owned by Steve and Morag Smith. Directors on the series include Steve Smith, Rick Green and William G. Elliott.

During the show's run, The Red Green Show was nominated for 23 Gemini Awards, but only won once, in 1998, for Best Performance in a Comedy Program or Series.

The show

The title character, Red Green (Steve Smith), is a handyman who tries to find shortcuts to most of his projects, trusting most of his work to duct tape, which he calls "the handyman's secret weapon". He is the president of the Possum Lodge, a fictional men's club in the small northwestern Ontario town of Possum Lake, near the also-fictional town of Port Asbestos. He and his fellow lodge members had their own television show in which they gave lessons and demonstrations in repair work, outdoor activities and advice for men.

Segments
The show's basic concept was that of a cable television show, taped in part on a hand-held camera by Red's nephew, Harold. The show's structure evolved over time and included several regular segments that appeared in almost every episode. These segments were interspersed with each episode's three main plot segments. The most frequent segments were "The Possum Lodge Word Game", "Handyman Corner" and "Adventures with Bill".

Handyman Corner
Red attempted to demonstrate creative and often humorous ways to tackle relatively common tasks, such as taking out the trash or making use of derelict cars or creating something extravagant out of whatever he could get his hands on. Memorable examples included a paddlewheeler made out of a van on pallets and a revolving door, a jet pack made from two propane tanks, a hybrid car from recycled golf carts and satellite dishes, a kiddie ride made from a bar stool attached to the agitator of a washing machine, and SCUBA gear made from an old gas grill, including a shark cage made from the grills. Duct tape, "the handyman's secret weapon", was usually the fastener of choice. In one episode, he tried to duct tape the Ontario–Quebec border as a potential solution to Quebec separatism. The segment customarily concluded with the aphorism, "If the women don't find you handsome, they should at least find you handy."

Adventures with Bill
A black-and-white segment in the form of a narrated home movie, silent but with sound effects, music and narration. The movie would show Red and Bill attempting to accomplish a relatively straightforward task, try out a sport, or go on some adventure, invariably leading to all-out slapstick comedy. Later in the series, other characters were featured, sometimes without Red or Bill. As the action occurred, Red narrated each adventure.

The Possum Lodge Word Game
Structured like Password or Pyramid, the objective was to get a contestant to say a certain word in 30 seconds by giving them various clues. In this version, however, the contestant almost always gave answers that were either way off or very odd due to the contestant's preoccupation with their own work or lifestyle. They would finally say the correct word by accident or through the use of a grouping of words or another word that would sound similar to the answer. The referee would often announce that week's prize in a misleading way, to make it sound much more desirable. One such prize was "a new house ... roof ... shingle." This often featured Harold or Mike Hamar as the host, though other members would sometimes host this sketch.

North of Forty
Red gives out sage advice from behind his fly tying workbench, usually talking to older men about married life or coping with changing society. "Let's face it", he quipped in one episode, "these days, if you're not young, you're old". This segment always concluded with, "Remember, I'm pulling for you. We're all in this together."

Buddy System
Red and another character, standing together at the base of the basement stairs in a close-up, giving men advice on how to get out of various jams, usually with their wives, although, in later seasons, Red was often replaced by another character.

Poetry and songs
In earlier episodes, Red often recited small bits of poetry in the woods. The segments were named depending on the season and had a humorous twist on a famous saying. For example, the winter segment is named "Winter of Our Discount Tent". In many shows, Red and Harold could be seen sitting at a campfire, with Red usually strumming a guitar and singing an original humorous song with Harold providing vocal accents and percussion with various items such as spoons, gas cans, and junk metal. In later seasons, the characters gave brief biographical sketches of "famous" Possum Lake residents, consisting of various odd historical photos accompanied by narration.

Male Call and The Experts
A regular segment where Harold would read a letter supposedly from a viewer and Red would answer it, often misinterpreting what the viewer was asking. This evolved into "The Experts", where Red and another character answer alleged letters from viewers and always give ridiculous advice, often debating on what the viewer meant or needed. "The Experts" was always introduced with one of the lodge members (usually Harold, Mike, Dalton or Winston) saying, "Welcome to 'The Experts' portion of the show where we examine those three little words men find so hard to say ..." The audience, in front of which the show was filmed, would then chant in unison, "I DON'T KNOW!"

Character-specific segments
Ranger Gord's "educational" segments featured safety cartoons, with anthropomorphic animals that looked like Red and Harold, and occasionally advice with Dalton Humphrey, Winston Rothschild and Mike Hamar. In the season Mike Hamar was introduced, he would often try to help Red around the lodge, but with humorously disastrous results due to miscommunication or Mike trying to imitate Red's corner-cutting shortcuts. Hap Shaughnessy appeared in many segments and always told Red outlandish stories about his life and occasionally another character, who would doubt Hap's claims and start making jokes about them. Among other things, Hap claims to have been an astronaut, to have fought Sonny Liston, to have invented television and basketball, and to have once advised Walt Disney on how many fingers to put on Mickey Mouse.  In later seasons, they added an animal segment with Local Animal Control Specialists, Garth Harble and later Ed Frid, who is deathly afraid of almost all animals.  The segment usually saw Garth or Ed handling various animals with disastrous results.  For example, in one segment, Ed brings in a weasel that bites his thumb as he tries to handle it, causing him to freak out.

Mike's Teen Talk
Mike Hamar gave outrageous advice to teenagers that contradicts common sense, such as why it is advantageous to be stupid.

Other repair segments
Other repair segments were aired throughout the show.  Many of the episodes in later seasons had small segments similar to Handyman's Corner where Red would show quick ways to tackle everyday tasks that were creative.  This would be used to open the show.  The differences were that it was not referred to as Handyman's Corner, nor would Red close the segment with his iconic catchphrase of "If the women don't find you handsome, they should at least find you handy."  Another repair segment that appeared from time to time was one Red liked to call "If it ain't broke, you're not trying!"  The segment would see members of Possum Lodge bringing in various items they say were broken, and Red would try to fix them.  The broken items were used and/or broken in relation to the lodge member who brought it in.  For example, in one segment, lodge member Dwight Cardiff brought in a broken "Garberator" garbage disposal which was broken when he tried to be lazy and stuff every piece of garbage into the disposal, even stuff that didn't belong in it.  Another instance was when explosives enthusiast, Edgar K. B. Montrose brought in a dining room table set asking Red to repair it like new after he had accidentally caused an explosion at his mom's house, turning the entire set except one chair into sawdust.

Conclusion and credits
The show usually concluded with Red giving a message to his wife, Bernice, usually a double entendre and delivering his signature piece of life advice in the form of a hockey metaphor: "Keep your stick on the ice." This was followed by a general meeting of the Possum Lodge membership while the credits rolled, which began with the ritual stating of the Lodge motto—"Quando omni flunkus moritati", mock Latin for "When all else fails, play dead". From season six onward, this was often followed by the Man's Prayer: "I'm a man—but I can change—if I have to—I guess." In the final episode of the series, a revised version of the prayer was said: "I'm a man—but I changed—because I had to. Oh. well." Steve Smith later identified that this was a tribute to his wife Morag, who had simply commented, "Oh, well", upon viewing the first episode in 1991. In one episode, women take over Possum Lodge and change the prayer to "I am woman, hear me roar. I'm in charge, get over it."

History

Smith originally created the character of Red Green for his 1979–1985 sketch comedy series Smith & Smith. The sketch was a parody of the long-running Canadian outdoors show The Red Fisher Show (1968–1989), starring B.H. "Red" Fisher, in which Red and his friends would show silent films of their fishing trips with commentary at "Scuttlebutt Lodge". The character also appeared in Me & Max and The Comedy Mill before becoming the focus of his own series.

The Red Green Show was produced first by CHCH-TV in Hamilton, Ontario, then by CFPL-TV in London, and then by the Global Television Network, before finally finding its permanent home at CBC Television for the 1997 season (its seventh) onward. The show was renamed The New Red Green Show upon its move to Global, and would keep this title until its second season at CBC.

The show ended 7 April 2006 after its 15th season with exactly 300 episodes. This longevity inspired a joke in one episode, where Red says "The question is, can you do anything with crap? Obviously the answer is yes, we're in our fourteenth season."

The last episode was filmed on 5 November 2005, at the Showline Studios Harbourside location. At the time the season began taping, the Canadian Broadcasting Corporation locked out staffers who were members of the Canadian Media Guild, rendering the show's regular studios at the Canadian Broadcasting Centre unavailable. The last episode concluded with the show breaking the fourth wall by thanking the audience and fans for their popularity. In addition, the Man's Prayer was changed to "I'm a man—but I changed—because I had to. Oh, well."

As the show gained popularity, Steve Smith also wrote a syndicated newspaper column, as Red Green, titled North of 40 in which he would give advice to readers.

In previous years, the show would stage live mini-telethons (sometimes called "Red Green-a-thons") for public television stations in the United States. These usually coincided with national PBS fundraising drives, and featured contests between various PBS stations carrying the show. This was done to encourage new stations to carry Red Green, for those who already have it to continue it, and in one year Red playfully dumped stations that chose to discontinue the show in a wheelbarrow.

Since 2000, Red Green has been the "Ambassador of Scotch Duct Tape" for 3M.

On 14 December 2008, a retrospective special titled "The Red Green Story-We're All In This Together" aired on select PBS stations. The special was released on DVD along with a book. Also, despite stating after the show's final episode that he planned to permanently retire his character, in 2010, Smith embarked on the "Wit and Wisdom Comedy Tour", in which he gave live performances as Red Green in cities across the United States and Canada.

On 29 November 2012, Steve Smith announced a new "How To Do Everything" Tour, which kicked off in Canada in fall 2013 before going to the United States in spring 2014. The 2016 North American tour, "I'm Not Old, I'm Ripe", began in March and concluded in May, with stops in 25 U.S. cities. The 2019 North American tour, "This Could Be It", began in March 2019 and ran until the end of October, with shows in 34 U.S. cities and 29 Canadian cities.

Syndication
From September 1998 to August 7, 2017, The Red Green Show aired on The Comedy Network. From 2002 to 2005, reruns aired on CBC, Thursdays at 12:30pm and Saturdays at 6:30pm Eastern. In the United States, digital multicast network Heartland added reruns of the show to its schedule in September 2018. There is also currently a Red Green Channel on Roku televisions.

Main characters

Red Green

The title character of The Red Green Show, Red (Steve Smith) is the leader of Possum Lodge and a self-proclaimed handyman who is constantly extolling the virtues of duct tape ("the handyman's secret weapon"). He is married to Bernice Green and does not have any children. He is seldom seen without his trademark red-and-green suspenders and Canadian military field manoeuvres cap.

According to Red's DVD biography, Red became the leader of Possum Lodge after gradually becoming more involved with it over time and becoming "the only guy nobody hated." At one point, he borrowed a large sum of money from his brother just before his brother lost his job at the bank. In repayment, Red employed his nephew Harold as the producer and director of The Red Green Show.

In addition to being a handyman, Red also has several main philosophies in life, some of which are passed on to the lodge as a whole. Chief among them is the phrase "Quando Omni Flunkus Moritati" (pseudo-Latin for "When all else fails, play dead"). He also concludes each of his Handyman Corner segments with the phrase, "If the women don't find you handsome, they should at least find you handy."

Red owns what is known as "the Possum Van", a 1979–1993 Dodge Ram cargo van, painted as a grey 'possum on a pale blue background, and with a licence plate reading simply "POSSUM". It is one of Red's few vehicles that actually runs. It has played (and donated) many parts in Handyman's Corner projects. After the series ended, the van was scrapped.

Red's dry, often sarcastic wit is balanced by a strong sense of camaraderie with his fellow lodge members, partly because he directs most of his sarcasm toward Harold. Despite this, Harold and the rest of Possum Lodge seem to regard Red with a high level of respect, though occasionally some of the lodge members will challenge his authority in one way or another.

Harold Green
Harold (Patrick McKenna) is Red's nephew and the fictional producer and director of The Red Green Show. He is a nerd, having a significant overbite, wearing thick glasses, and is very eager and sensitive. He is often appalled by Red and the other lodge members and he puts much effort into trying to change everyone's behaviour, usually with little or no success.

Harold's advanced knowledge of computers, television and technology originally landed him the job of producer and director of the television show, often wielding a portable device with dials and a keyboard, used to create the show's visual effects and transitions, although he did not have it in later seasons. This prop was assembled out of an Ampex VR 1200 videotape recorder, a Mini-Tec terminal keyboard, and a set of rabbit-ear antennas. Later in the show's history, he became employed at Multicorp and went to work in the neighbouring town of Port Asbestos. He later became the publicity manager for Possum Lake, and eventually fell in love with Bonnie (Laurie Elliott), a commercial truck driver who shares nearly all of his unusual mannerisms. The two characters were married in the final episode of the series; a flashforward reveals that Harold and Bonnie have two children, a son and a daughter.

Harold and Red spend much of their time on the show trading insults and poking fun at each other. While they have shown they can cooperate with one another at times, Harold is often very critical of Red's ideas and schemes, but usually ends up going along with them anyway.

In the film Duct Tape Forever, Harold is not a member of the Possum Lodge. At the end, the brotherhood accept him and take him in.

Bill Smith
Bill (Rick Green) is the star of the "Adventures with Bill" segment, in which he and at least one other character (usually Red) attempt to perform relatively simple tasks or try a sport or game in the clumsiest, most accident-prone way possible. (These segments are done in a silent home-movie format with a voiceover by Red.) Bill rarely actually speaks, and has only appeared on the main set of the show in the second season (still silently) and in the series' final episode. Aside from episode 54 "The Tanks We Get", these are the only times Bill is ever seen in colour, though he shows up in colour at the end of the credits sequence (for the first season, at least) since the "Adventures" segments are shown in black-and-white. When something goes wrong, as it invariably does each episode, Bill can be heard as a muffled scream; these are anticipation of injury, not actual injury, such as Bill screaming as he falls off the ladder, not when he hits the ground. In some segments, Bill can be heard speaking in gibberish, but the explanation for not hearing him clearly is usually that the camera they use for these segments has a weak microphone. Later in the show's history, the "Adventures with Bill" segment was expanded to include more characters, and not necessarily Bill alone.

In each "Adventures" segment in which Bill appears, he usually attempts to do something of an outdoors nature, such as backpacking, building something, chopping down a tree, or playing a sport. Each of his actions are basically slapstick comedy routines—for example, when he swings an axe, it flies out of his hands and smashes into another character or Red's Possum Van. In what has become a classic occurrence, Bill often manages to knock one or both of the side mirrors off the van. He can also store large tools and miscellaneous items in his overalls, and pull them out on demand. Many segments show Bill getting hurt somehow, but apparently not seriously or permanently. (One segment in particular ends with Bill's arms crushed and flattened in a grape press.) There is generally no continuity from one "Adventures" segment to the next, and Bill comes back in the following episode, good as new.

Ranger Gord
Ranger Gord (Peter Keleghan) is the local forest ranger who spends almost all of his time alone in Fire Watch Tower 13 and, later in the series, Tower 3. His full name is Gordon Ranger, but he prefers not to be called "Ranger Ranger." He is always seen wearing his ranger outfit (which he apparently launders using only a blow dryer), and he finds various eccentric ways to pass his time, even while Red is visiting. For example, he has been seen making nature-sounds tapes by verbally mimicking animal noises into a tape recorder, and he claims to use baked beans as his alarm clock. In one episode, he is found by Red to be hibernating.

Gord has worked in his watch tower for more than eighteen years without a paycheque and claims to have been a forest ranger his entire life. His apparent reason for becoming a ranger was that he thought Smokey Bear was talking directly to him in one of his famous public service announcements ("Only you can prevent forest fires"). He frequently breaks out in tears during Red's visits as he talks about how lonely he is or how much of a sacrifice he makes at his job. During one visit, Gord claimed to have gotten so lonely that he ate the watch tower and then later moved on to another tower in season 7. Gord sometimes laments his lack of recognition. Once, he thought that someone had left him some honorary medallions, only to learn from Red that they were beer bottle caps; Gord thought that a Budweiser cap was for being a "bud of the forest". On another occasion, Gord justified his lack of communication with his superiors as a sign that he was doing a "good job protecting the forest", to which Red suggested that his superiors most likely forgot about him. In truth, it turned out that he had been dismissed many years ago, but the message had never reached him.

Later in the series (seasons 9 to 13, between 1999 and 2004), Ranger Gord made a series of 23 short "educational" cartoons about the environment. Written, animated, produced, directed, and voiced by Gord in person, these films always feature an animated version of Gord as a muscle-bound superhero type (sometimes with absurdly-bombastic and self-aggrandizing opening titles such as "Ranger Gord presents: Ranger Gord in Ranger Gord's educational films.  Drawn, written, produced, and voiced by Ranger Gord.  Starring Ranger Gord"), and Red and Harold Green make appearances as a 'possum (due to Red's being the Possum Lodge leader) and beaver (as a sarcastic reference to Harold's "toothy" overbite), respectively. Dalton and Mike also appear in one short, depicted as a bear and a raccoon, respectively. The cartoons' subjects have included finding money at the end of a rainbow, planting a cell phone to grow a telephone pole, and waging a fire-fight against the Sun and its deadly ultraviolet rays. The cartoons were actually written by staff writers, starting with Shaun Graham, who wrote the six original shorts. All 23 shorts were designed, directed, and animated by Bryce Hallett of Frog Feet Productions.

The original fire watch tower shown in seasons 1–2 was the treehouse in Steve Smith's backyard in Hamilton, Ontario, that he had put up for his sons. From seasons 3 to 6, it was filmed in an actual watch tower, in reality located at Port Carling, Ontario. By season 8, it was a set. Gord appeared in the lodge during season 7, saying that he had eaten the front two legs of the tower ("I ran out of creamed corn, so I got hungry") and caused it to fall over. In the movie Duct Tape Forever, the tower had burned down (an obvious irony, since Gord's whole purpose in the tower was to watch for forest fires; the implication may have been that Gord either had been "sleeping on the job" when a lightning-bolt ignited the tower and thus was not watching out for fire the way he'd been supposed to, or else that he had accidentally started the fire himself while using a cook-stove or performing some other activity inside the tower which involved using flames or heat) and Ranger Gord was then in charge of a train station located at the end of a section of unfinished tracks and thus where no trains ever run; this is an obvious pun on Gord still having a "dead-end job", just like his former merely-self-maintained forest ranger position that the National Forest Service cared nothing about.

Supporting Characters, Season 1 onward

Hap Shaughnessy
Hap Shaughnessy (Gordon Pinsent) is the water-taxi captain of Possum Lake, but he is much better known at Possum Lodge for his self-aggrandizing tall tales. In virtually every appearance he makes on the show, he makes a ridiculous claim to have been a significant person in history, or to have accomplished some incredible feat. Nobody else on the show believes him, but he will go to great lengths to tell his stories anyway. For example, he has claimed that he owns a coat that belonged to Santa Claus, that he once filled in for Keith Richards of The Rolling Stones, that he once raised tigers in Kenya, had a magnetized metal plate in his head, drove the Aston Martin featured in Goldfinger which he used as an actual spy, and that he even died and came back to life at the 1988 Summer Olympics.  In one episode, it is hinted that he lies about his past because he has a poor self-image.

Hap is always seen wearing a Royal Canadian Regiment baseball cap, which is a nod to Pinsent's own military service as a soldier in the Regiment during the early 1950s.

Dougie Franklin
Dougie Franklin (Ian Thomas) is an American immigrant who drives a huge "Meals on 4 Wheels" monster truck he calls "Imelda", and who is a self-proclaimed expert in two areas of life: cars and women, in spite of never having had a successful date, and several automotive altercations, partly due to his inability to understand Canadian traffic laws, and his reckless driving. His brother Ben was seen in a few episodes, played by Ian Thomas' actual brother Dave Thomas of SCTV.

Jimmy MacVey
Jimmy MacVey (Will Millar) is a Scottish Postal Worker who is "in the process" of restoring an old wooden boat in his spare time, at the expense of losing his wife who left him. Through several episodes, he demonstrates how to repair certain portions, such as using autographed novels as shims, and a ceiling fan and a camera tripod as the propeller and propeller shaft, resp.

Jack the Hermit
Jack (Tim Sims) is an advertising executive with a family, who is suffering from extreme paranoia, complaining about the cold war, bombs, pollution, terrorism, lawyers, dictators, and of course taxes. He has taken to hiding in a crack in the ground cave armed with a hockey stick to await the end of Western Civilization with his 6-week supply of canned goods.

Glen Brackston
Glen Brackston (Mark Wilson) is the operator and only employee of Brackston's Marina. Glen is a large and incredibly lazy man, often seen sitting on his lawn chair or napping. He has suffered five heart attacks, and has seven daughters. In the earliest seasons, his laziness was due to his obsessive focus on his RV. Later on, he would appear with Red in the "Boating Tips" segment, where he would give advice or instructions on how to maintain and care for boats. However, he would often make Red perform these tasks for him, citing his poor health as leaving him unable to do it on his own. Glen is a Boston Red Sox fan; he is usually seen wearing a Red Sox cap.

Bob Stuyvesant
Bob Stuyvesant (Bruce Hunter) works for the Ministry of Dept of Natural Resources, and is almost always seen playing golf, although he always plays poorly. Hotheaded and contemptuously arrogant, Bob claims to know everything about golf, but can't seem to apply it to his own game, taking wild slices and often sending his ball into water or bushes, prompting an instant temper tantrum and causing him to throw his golf club. Same with women – Bob has been married 5 times. When out golfing, Bob purports to be "conducting undercover research" for the Ministry, claiming that he is taking soil and air samples. He once claimed that his golf ball was a "dimpled ergonometer", and that his putter was a "wind speed calibration wrench".

Supporting Characters, Season 2 only

Noel Christmas
Noel Christmas, the Head of Security (Kevin Frank), who in his overzealousness often causes more problems than he solves.

Helmut Wintergarden
Helmut Wintergarden, the Head of Maintenance (BJ Woodbury), who continually works on the pumps, but never really gets them fixed, as they continue to leak.

Doc Render
"Doc" Render, the Medic (Neil Crone) who "stretches" the truth, has a gambling problem, and borrows money from others but never pays them back.

Douglas
Douglas, the Treasurer (David Huband), who pinches every penny and complains about members wanting money for stupid things.

Eddie
Eddie, the Cook (Bill Carr), who has lofty aspirations of performing on Broadway.

Murray
Murray, the Store Owner (Ed Sahely), who is crooked and overcharges others for defective merchandise and then refuses any returns or refunds.

Dwane
Dwane, his dimwitted Assistant (Nick Johne), who often tends to give away their scam.

Supporting Characters, Season 3 onward

Work In Progress...

Dalton Humphrey
Dalton (Bob Bainborough) is the owner of Humphrey's Everything Store out on the main highway and is one of Red's best friends. He is one of the few financially successful lodge members. He is a cheapskate and tries to conserve money as much as possible, shortchanging and cheating people. When he isn't complaining about the state of things at his store, he generally complains about his troubled marriage to Ann Marie and their daughter's spending habits.

Dalton has been with the show since season 4, and takes part in the vast majority of the show's main storylines. He has a strong relationship with Red, joining him on his regular fishing trips and taking part in many aspects of the Possum Lodge operations. He also takes his fatherhood very seriously, often trying to pass on his ideas and wisdom to other people (most notably Harold). He generally tells people exactly what he thinks of them, even if it means offending them.

Ann Marie only appeared onscreen once, in the final episode, in which she and Dalton renewed their wedding vows (her face was obscured by her bridal veil); however, she was sometimes seen in shadow in scenes set near their home (her voice was provided by Jennifer Irwin). Their daughter, Tabitha, appeared in the film Duct Tape Forever, played by Tracy Dawson, although there she goes by the name Mandy.

Mike Hamar
Mike (Wayne Robson) is a career criminal who joined Possum Lodge while on parole from federal prison. He has become another of Red's best friends and often tries to help out around the Lodge, though he is not very good at handyman tasks in general. He talks a lot about his troubled childhood, mostly about his mother, exotic dancer "Bambi Bazooms" (episode 100), and many "fathers". Mike suffers from low self-esteem and poor planning, usually causing those around him to try to cheer him up again. He is the only character who regularly refers to Red as "Mr. Green". As revealed in the final episode, Mike eventually becomes a police officer.

Winston Rothschild III
Winston (Jeff Lumby) is the owner and sole employee of Rothschild's Sewage and Septic Sucking Services. Like Dalton and Mike, Winston is one of Red Green's friends and takes part in the day-to-day operations at Possum Lodge. He is always seen wearing a hard hat, off-white button-down shirt, a bow tie and hip waders. He is generally upbeat and has a positive outlook on life, and is usually able to look on the bright side of things, even in the face of certain disaster. He is also a fan of self-help speakers Anthony Anthony (whom he likes to quote frequently), Wally Himmler, cited as the author of "How to Have More of Everything" (episode 80), Ed Big, cited as the author of "Think Big by Ed Big" (episode 78), and Walter Mollusk, creator of the video, "Seize the Self-Help Course of the Day" (episode 86).

A true entrepreneur, Winston describes sewage and septic sucking as his lifelong dream. He owns his own equipment and a septic truck, apparently his only means of transportation, even on his usually unsuccessful dates. Throughout the series, he appears in a wide variety of commercials advertising his septic sucking business, usually with a humorous quip, such as "We're number one in the number two business"; "We'll take that smell off your hands"; "We come in a truck and leave in a daze", etc. In later episodes, his commercials tend to parody the advertising campaigns of numerous Canadian companies.

He also has a tendency to confuse certain phrases and adages, saying things like "Significant Mother" or "Catch-23".

Edgar K. B. Montrose
Edgar Montrose (Graham Greene) is Possum Lodge's First Nation explosives enthusiast. He believes that any problem, including leaky roofs and invasive weeds, can be solved with explosives. He is usually seen wearing singed overalls, a cracked construction helmet and a pair of ear protectors, though he rarely covers his ears with them. According to him, he was born in Assiniboia, Saskatchewan, and he started using explosives at a young age. He later enlisted in the Army and was dishonorably discharged after only three weeks, when he blew up the mess hall ("... turns out they were only thinking of building a new one").

Edgar's heavy use of explosives over the years has caused him to lose most of his hearing, which often leads to nonsensical responses to questions and comments. For example, Red will ask him, "What have you brought for us today, Edgar?" and Edgar will respond, "Oh, just fine, Red." He is also missing a finger on his left hand, though the story of how he lost it changes each time he tells it. He claims to not have many friends, and according to his DVD biography, he has "yet to meet a woman that likes to spend a Saturday night watching [him] blow a fully-grown Douglas Fir tree clean over the lake."

Edgar's middle initials, K.B., are rumored to stand for "Ka Boom!", his favorite catch-phrase. His favorite movie is The Bridge on the River Kwai, saying, "Did you see that baby go up at the end?" After seeing the movie Dances with Wolves, Edgar thought that the "Native guy" should have received an Oscar for his role. (Greene had been nominated for Best Supporting Actor for his role as Kicking Bird in the movie, but lost to Joe Pesci in Goodfellas.)

Ed Frid
Ed Frid (Jerry Schaefer) is Possum Lake's second animal control officer (the first being Garth Harble). He is deathly afraid of almost all animals, and believes they are out to get him. He is featured on The Red Green Show in the "Talking Animals" segment, in which Red tries to get him to show the audience a small animal, such as a weasel or a leech. Invariably, something goes wrong and causes Ed to panic, usually bringing an abrupt and comedic end to the segment.

Buzz Sherwood
Buzz Sherwood (Peter Wildman) is a local bush pilot known around Possum Lake for his eccentric antics in his small Cessna seaplane, which he moors on the Possum Lodge boat dock. He has an incredibly boisterous personality, often acting extremely hyperactive and happy-go-lucky. Despite being in his 40s, he still views himself as a child, and is known for his wild laughter and habit of punching people's arms in greeting. He is the founder of Buzz Off Airlines.

Dwight Cardiff
Dwight Cardiff (George Buza) is the only character ever shown to be lazier than Glen Brackston. Dwight is the operator at the Port Asbestos Marina, although he occasionally traveled to the Lodge to appear on the show. Dwight is unwilling to do anything that requires him to move, such as going inside when it rains (what he calls "passive environmental interaction"). He also claims to have had a pet snail as a child, but it "ran away on [him]".

Arnie Dogan
Arnie Dogan (Albert Schultz) is an accident-prone roofer with aspirations of becoming a country music singer. Frequently wearing some manner of orthopedic appliance from his latest mishap, he insists that roofing is "in my blood" and that he continue with his work despite its seemingly hazardous nature. Arnie is renowned for having written over 17,000 songs (most of which are terrible) and he enjoys playing them for lodge members at any opportunity, much to the chagrin and irritation of the latter.

Kevin Black
Kevin Black (Paul Gross) is a yuppie developer from the big city who is usually outwitted by the landowners of Possum Lake. Kevin Black appeared in the sixth and seventh seasons. He is frequently surprised by the rural aspects of Possum Lake, such as the idea of having to dig a well in order to get water.

Charlie Farquharson
Charlie Farquharson (Don Harron) is a "charter member" of Possum Lodge. He is from Parry Sound, often making unfavorable comparisons between it and Possum Lake. He was also the KORN radio announcer from Hee Haw.

Minor characters
Throughout its fifteen-season run, The Red Green Show sported a cast of well over forty secondary and minor characters, ranging from fellow Possum Lodge members to guests making single appearances, and even audience members appearing on the set. During the second season, the regular cast was expanded to include many different lodge members, none of whom were kept on for appearances after the second season.
 
The cast, while primarily male, in later seasons did include occasional female characters as well, including network executive Kelly Cook (Sugar Lyn Beard) and Anne-Marie Humphrey (Jennifer Irwin), Dalton's wife.

Unseen characters
In addition to the already long list of characters, there are several characters who are frequently referred to, but are never seen. The most frequently mentioned are Red's friends Junior Singleton, Buster Hadfield, Moose Thompson, Stinky Peterson, and Old Man Sedgewick. The in-show descriptions of these characters are often far-fetched and outlandish, as are their actual names:

 Bernice Green: Red's wife, whom he married without waiting for the results of the pregnancy test. Red claims they had tried to have children but after Harold was born they took that as a warning. She is often exasperated with the antics of Red and the other lodge members, and often tries to encourage Red to partake in activities like the arts and eating at fine restaurants, usually to disastrous effect. In one episode, she faked a love letter from one of Red's old girlfriends (which turned out to be an affectionate letter from Red's mother) and Red resolved to take Bernice out to dinner any night the episode aired, to prevent her from seeing it and becoming jealous. In spite of this she and Red do seem to be close, and Red often implies they have an active sex life. Bernice has a niece named Alicia whose oral condition has earned her the nickname "Horse" (at one point, out of desperation, Harold considered marrying Alicia).
 Old Man Sedgewick: Orville Lloyd Dutton Manly Alvin Norbert "Old Man" Sedgewick. Old Man Sedgewick's age is never officially disclosed, although he is reported to have known John A. Macdonald when he (John) was only a child, and in one episode, he is said to have been born "sometime in the Mesozoic era". He does have a son who was 97 years of age, and his parents were still alive (his father bearing the name "Dead Man Walking Sedgewick"). Sedgewick is often described as being irritable and suffering from senility, for which he takes medication.
 Junior Singleton: An odd member of Possum Lodge. Married to his wife Noreen shortly after meeting at a tool swap, with an entire episode dedicated to preparing for his stag party. Junior is often the first to question Red's decisions or authority and at one point tried to found a rival lodge which failed. It is implied that Junior and Noreen are obese. Junior's hands are seen retrieving a storm window that Red has appropriated for a project in Episode 126, near 6:04.
 Moose Thompson: Mooseworth Hugo Largess "Moose" Thompson is an extremely overweight member of the lodge. He is implied to be rather dim-witted, saying that he thought his nickname made him sound stupid, so he considered changing it to "Moose Johnson".
 Stinky Peterson: Stephen Riechen Puanteur "Stinky" Peterson has a pronounced stench and appalling personal habits. At one point Harold wondered if the scent was dangerous or toxic, which Red assured him was not the case because the lodge members keep canaries by his front door. In one episode Stinky burned his mattress, releasing a cloud of toxic gas that surrounded the Lodge.
 Flinty McClintock [A.K.A. "Flinty Watson" when first mentioned in Episode 54]: Owner of a scrap metal yard, tow service, and an "African Lion Safari" which mostly consists of snow fences and a lion so lazy and out of shape it might be a deformed pig.
 Buster Hadfield: An extremely lazy divorcee who once spent more time at the Lodge than at home, precipitating his divorce. His daughter Susie once stole Harold's lunch money, but it was later found that she might have feelings for Harold, which of course went nowhere.
 Wally "Kickback" Kibler: The Mayor of Possum Lake.
 Fuzzy Norton: A character rarely mentioned and thus poorly defined.

Episodes

DVD releases
Acorn Media has released portions of The Red Green Show on DVD in Region 1 in various incarnations.

In 2002–2003, they released six compilation DVDs labeled as "Stuffed and Mounted" volumes 1 through 6. Each DVD contains episodes from various seasons of the show up to season 10 (the most current season at the time these DVDs were released). However, there were no episodes from season two. These DVDs feature a spoken-word introduction by Steve Smith (out of character, as evidenced by his higher-pitched voice).

In 2006, Acorn began to release the series on DVD in complete season sets. Of note, the releases are identified by year, not season number; thus the 7th season is labeled as "1997 Season", the 8th season is "1998 Season", and so on. Seasons 7 through 11 were released in this format.

In 2010, Acorn changed formats again, they began releasing compilation sets which contain episodes from multiple seasons all grouped together. The first release, The Red Green Show: The Infantile Years, features all 72 episodes from the first 3 seasons in a 9-disc set. Extras include introductions by Steve Smith, and Red & Harold character biographies. Seasons 4 through 6 were released in The Red Green Show: The Toddlin' Years. Seasons 7 through 9 were released in The Red Green Show: The Delinquent Years. Seasons 10 through 12 were released in The Red Green Show: The Midlife Crisis Years. On 20 September 2011, Acorn released The Red Green Show: The Geezer Years, which contains episodes from the final three seasons (13–15).

Season sets

Special releases

References

External links

The Red Green Show at CBC.ca
The Red Green Show at PBS.org

The Red Green Show on YouTube
The Red Green Show — Behind the Scenes (Part 1) on YouTube
The Red Green Show — Behind the Scenes (Part 2) on YouTube

1991 Canadian television series debuts
2006 Canadian television series endings
1990s Canadian sketch comedy television series
2000s Canadian sketch comedy television series
Canadian satirical television series
Canadian Screen Award-winning television shows
CBC Television original programming
Global Television Network original programming
Northern Ontario in fiction
Television series by Corus Entertainment
Television series by S&S Productions
Television series about television
Television shows filmed in Hamilton, Ontario
Television shows filmed in London, Ontario
Television shows filmed in Toronto
Television shows set in Ontario
YTV (Canadian TV channel) original programming